Down was a county constituency of the Parliament of Northern Ireland from 1921 to 1929. It returned eight MPs, using proportional representation by means of the single transferable vote.

Boundaries
Down was created by the Government of Ireland Act 1920 and consisted of the administrative County Down (that is, excluding those parts of the historic county within the County Borough of Belfast). The House of Commons (Method of Voting and Redistribution of Seats) Act (Northern Ireland) 1929 divided the constituency into eight constituencies elected under first past the post: Ards, East Down, Iveagh, Mid Down, Mourne, North Down, South Down and West Down.

Second Dáil
In May 1921, Dáil Éireann, the parliament of the self-declared Irish Republic run by Sinn Féin, passed a resolution declaring that elections to the House of Commons of Northern Ireland and the House of Commons of Southern Ireland would be used as the election for the Second Dáil. All those elected were on the roll of the Second Dáil, but Éamon de Valera, who was also elected for Clare, was the only MP elected for Down to sit as a TD in Dáil Éireann.

Politics
Down had a Unionist majority, but with strong Nationalist support in the south.  In both elections, six Unionists were elected, alongside one Nationalist and one Republican.

Members of Parliament

Election results

References

Northern Ireland Parliament constituencies established in 1921
Northern Ireland Parliament constituencies disestablished in 1929
Constituencies of the Northern Ireland Parliament
Historic constituencies in County Down
Dáil constituencies in Northern Ireland (historic)